Innaarsuit (old spelling: Ivnârssuit) is an island settlement in Avannaata municipality in northwestern Greenland. Located on an island of the same name, the settlement had 180 inhabitants in 2020.

Upernavik Archipelago 

Innaarsuit is located within Upernavik Archipelago, a vast archipelago of small islands on the coast of northeastern Baffin Bay.

Population 
Innaarsuit is one of the few settlements in Avannaata municipality exhibiting significant growth patterns over the course of the last two decades, increasing by nearly half relative to 1990 levels, similarly to other settlements in the northern half of the archipelago: Kullorsuaq, and Tasiusaq.

Transport 

During weekdays Air Greenland serves the village as part of government contract, with flights from Innaarsuit Heliport to Tasiusaq Heliport and to Upernavik Airport.

2018 Iceberg
In July 2018, an unusually large iceberg appeared off the shore of Innaarsuit. 
Some residents were evacuated in case the iceberg calved causing a wave that could swamp the settlement.

References 

Populated places in Greenland
Populated places of Arctic Greenland
Tasiusaq Bay
Upernavik Archipelago